Natasha Negovanlis (born April 3, 1990) is a Canadian actress, writer, producer, and singer. She achieved international recognition for portraying Carmilla Karnstein in the web series Carmilla (2014–2016) and in the 2017 feature film based on the series.

Career
Before acting professionally, Negovanlis studied musical theatre and film at the Wexford Collegiate School for the Arts in Toronto and Voice Performance at The Schulich School of Music at McGill University.

In 2014, Negovanlis was cast as the title role in the Canadian Screen Award winning web series Carmilla. In the series, which is based on the 1871-1872 gothic novella of the same name, Negovanlis portrays the vampire Carmilla Karnstein, who appears after her roommate's previous roommate vanishes. The series premiered on Vervegirl (rebranded as KindaTV as of February 2016) channel on August 19, 2014 and has achieved worldwide recognition and praise for its near all-female cast and positive representation of various LGBT characters.

In 2015, she also starred with her Carmilla co-star Elise Bauman in the feature film Almost Adults, which screened at several film festivals in 2016 before premiering on Netflix. Also that year, she appeared as herself in an episode of the Canadian anthology horror television series Slasher, and ranked 5th on AfterEllen's annual Hot 100 List.

At the 5th Canadian Screen Awards, Negovanlis won the Fan's Choice Award, with over two million votes, for her work on Carmilla. Her acceptance speech, in which she discussed the importance of queer representation, attracted media attention from various publications, including BuzzFeed and the Toronto Star.

In 2017, Negovanlis guest-starred in an episode of Murdoch Mysteries and reprised her role of Carmilla Karnstein in The Carmilla Movie, a spin-off feature film based on the series.

Later that year, alongside her Carmilla co-star Annie M. Briggs, Negovanlis successfully funded a digital series called CLAIREvoyant through an Independent Production Fund grant as well as an Indiegogo campaign that raised over $25,000 USD. The comedy was co-created, co-written, and co-produced by Negovanlis and Briggs, and it premiered on the KindaTV YouTube channel on May 16, 2018 and won an award at the New York Web Fest later that year.

In 2017, Negovanlis co-starred in her first American feature film, Freelancers Anonymous, which premiered at the historic Castro Theatre in San Francisco on June 15, 2018.

Personal life 
Negovanlis is of Macedonian and Greek descent on her father's side, while her mother is of mixed Irish, French, and Indigenous ancestry.

She has had relationships with both men and women and has publicly identified as queer, pansexual, or bisexual.

Negovanlis has an adopted rescue dog named Charlie.

Filmography

Accolades

References

External links

Official website

1990 births
Activists from Toronto
Actresses from Toronto
21st-century Canadian actresses
Canadian film actresses
Canadian LGBT actors
Canadian LGBT rights activists
Living people
Canadian web series actresses
Canadian people of Macedonian descent
Canadian people of Irish descent
Canadian people of Greek descent
Pansexual actresses
McGill University School of Music alumni
Canadian people of French descent
21st-century Canadian LGBT people